Paul Pétau (Paulus Petavius in Latin) (1568-1614) was a French publisher and book collector. He was conseiller of the Parlement de Paris from 1588 to 1614.

Life
After his death, his son Alexandre Pétau (died 1672) sold his massive collection of books for personal profit.

His books can still be found today in Vatican City's Library and the Library of the University of Leiden.

Excerpts

Charles Isaac Elton's book The Great Book-Collectors provides the following information about Paul Pétau:

References

External links
 British Museum
 wga.hu
 lexic.us

French publishers (people)
1568 births
1614 deaths
French book and manuscript collectors